Jonathan Boulet is an Australian musician from Sydney. Best known for his work as a solo artist, he wrote, recorded, produced and played almost every instrument in his small garage studio for his debut self-titled album. He played at the Splendour in the Grass music festival in July 2010. He has also toured and performed with acts such as Kate Nash, The Middle East, Tame Impala and Mumford and Sons. In December 2009, Boulet's self-titled debut album was the feature album on triple j.

Boulet studied at Gilroy College where he played in a metalcore band named City Escape Fire. He was also a member of Sydney indie rock band Parades, in which he played drums and contributed vocals, as well as experimental rock band, Top People, for which he recorded all instruments, except vocals and clarinet.

Discography

Jonathan Boulet
Jonathan Boulet – Modular Recordings (4 December 2009)
We Keep the Beat, Found the Sound, See the Need, Start the Heart – Modular Recordings (8 June 2012)
Gubba (2014)

Parades
foreign tapes (2010)

Party Dozen
The Living Man (2017)
Pray for Party Dozen (2020)

ARSE
Primitive Species (2017)

Usage in media
Boulet's songs have appeared in EA Sports games: "Ones Who Fly Twos Who Die" was used in 2010 FIFA World Cup South Africa and "You're a Animal" in FIFA 13 and Real Racing 3 on a Instrumental Version.

References

External links

Official website

Living people
Western Sydney University alumni
Year of birth missing (living people)